Rusta may refer to:

 Rusta, Iran, a village in Miankuh-e Moguyi Rural District, Iran
 Monte Rusta, mountain of the Veneto, Italy
 RUSTA, network of private institutions in Abidjan, Côte d'Ivoire
 Elona Rusta, Albanian professional racing cyclist

See also 

 Rosta (disambiguation)
 Rousta (disambiguation)
 Rustah (disambiguation)